Bodel is a surname. Notable people with the surname include:

Andy Bodel (born 1957), English footballer
Carmel Bodel (1912–2013), American figure skater
Edward Bodel (born 1926), American figure skater
Eleanor Bodel (born 1948), Swedish singer
Jean Bodel (c. 1165 – c. 1210), French poet
John Bodel (1834–1903), Australian politician